South Warsaw is an unincorporated community in Allen County, in the U.S. state of Ohio.

History
A post office called South Warsaw was established in 1856, and remained in operation until 1904. The original plat contained nine blocks.

References

Unincorporated communities in Allen County, Ohio
1856 establishments in Ohio
Populated places established in 1856
Unincorporated communities in Ohio